Admiral Sir Benjamin Hallowell Carew  (born Benjamin Hallowell; ?1 January 1761 – 2 September 1834) was a senior officer in the Royal Navy.  He was one of the select group of officers, referred to by Lord Nelson as his "Band of Brothers", who served with him at the Battle of the Nile.

Early years
Although he is often identified as Canadian, Hallowell's place and exact date of birth have been the subject of dispute among researchers.  He was possibly born on 1 January 1761 in Boston, Massachusetts, where his British father, former naval captain Benjamin Hallowell III, was Commissioner of the Board of Customs. His mother, Mary (Boylston) Hallowell, was the daughter of Thomas Boylston, and a first cousin of Susanna Boylston, the mother of the 2nd President of the United States, John Adams, and grandmother of the 6th President, John Quincy Adams. He was a brother of Ward Nicholas Boylston and a nephew of Governor Moses Gill.

His father's job exposed Hallowell's Loyalist family to attacks as American revolutionary sentiment grew. In August 1765 the Hallowell house in Roxbury was ransacked by a mob and the family relocated to Jamaica Plain and in September 1774 his father was pursued by a furious mob of 160 mounted men who had gathered to hear news of the resignation of other customs officials.  The family left the country in March 1776, at the outbreak of the American Revolutionary War, and their estates were stolen.  They stayed for a short time in Halifax, Nova Scotia, then took a passage to England in July 1776.

Educated in the private schools of England, through his father's connections with Admiral Samuel Hood, 1st Viscount Hood, Hallowell entered the Royal Navy at a slightly later age than was normal, receiving his promotion to lieutenant on 31 August 1781.

Naval career
Benjamin Hallowell's naval career spanned the American Revolutionary War, the French Revolutionary Wars and the Napoleonic Wars, and he took part in a number of important actions in all three. As a lieutenant in Admiral Lord Hood's fleet, he saw action in the Battles of St. Kitts and the Saintes in 1782. He continued on active service after the end of the war. In late 1790 he was promoted to the rank of commander into , which he then sailed to the coast of Africa. Commissioned as a post-captain in August 1793, he and his ship took part in the evacuation following the Siege of Toulon in that year.

By 1795 he was in command of HMS Courageux, and took part with her in the Battle of Hyères. He was not aboard in December 1796 when the vessel was wrecked after an incident in the Bay of Gibraltar during bad weather. Her mooring cable parted and she was driven within range of Spanish shore batteries; Hallowell, ashore to sit at a court-martial, was denied permission to rejoin the ship and take her to safety. She was subsequently wrecked off Monte Hacho in high winds during her officers' attempts to move to a safer anchorage, with the loss of almost 500 lives.

Following her loss, Hallowell served as a volunteer aboard  during the Battle of Cape St. Vincent (1797). Admiral Sir John Jervis commended Hallowell to the Admiralty by for his actions during the battle. Jervis, a stern and imposing figure, informed of the superior odds facing him, he expressed determination to attack no matter how strong the opposition; Hallowell, standing with Jervis on the deck of Victory, reportedly expressed loud approbation and thumped his commander-in-chief on the back in a startling display of familiarity.

Capture

On 10 June 1801 Hallowell encountered Pigmy and from her learned that a French squadron under Admiral Ganteaume had put to sea. Hallowell decided to return to reinforce Sir John Warren's squadron, but on 24 June Swiftsure encountered Ganteaume. The faster French squadron, consisting of four ships of the line and a frigate, overtook the already damaged and slow, as well as undermanned, Swiftsure. Indivisible and Dix-Août succeeded in shooting away Swiftsures yards and masts, crippling her and so forcing Hallowell to surrender. Swiftsure had two men killed, two men mortally wounded, and another six wounded; the French lost 33 killed and wounded.

On his repatriation, Hallowell received the court-martial that was automatic for a Royal Navy captain who had lost his ship, but was honourably acquitted. Meanwhile the French Navy took Swiftsure into service under her own name.

Nelson's coffin

Hallowell is probably best known as the man who made Nelson a present of what would become his own coffin, after the Battle of the Nile in August 1798. Hallowell commanded , a 74-gun ship of the line, during the battle. Swiftsure engaged the French flagship L'Orient at close quarters and played a major role in her destruction. Some time later Hallowell sent Nelson a coffin Hallowell had ordered to be made from a salvaged piece of L'Orients mainmast, with an accompanying note:  Nelson is said to have been pleased with the gift, keeping it propped against the wall of his cabin for some time, behind the chair in which he sat for dinner, and taking it with him to his next command. After Nelson was killed in 1805 during the Battle of Trafalgar, he was buried in the coffin Hallowell had given him.

Nelson had sent Tigre, along with five other vessels in his squadron, to Gibraltar for water and on convoy duty. However his old command, Swiftsure, took part on the French side. She and her officers and crew, including Hallowell, had been captured in 1801 after a fight with a squadron of five French warships. Hallowell faced a court-martial over this incident when he was returned to England after a short time as a prisoner of war, but he was honorably acquitted of any failure of duty.
  
Hallowell remained a serving naval officer after Nelson's death and went on to be Commander-in-Chief, Cork Station in 1818 and Commander-in-Chief, The Nore in 1821. He was promoted to the rank of Rear-Admiral of the Blue on 1 August 1811; Rear-Admiral of the White in 1812; Vice-Admiral of the Blue on 12 August 1819; Vice-Admiral of the White on 19 July 1821; and Admiral of the Blue in 1830.

Honours
Hallowell was awarded the Neapolitan Order of Saint Ferdinand and Merit for his actions during the siege of Corsica, an honour also presented to Nelson.  He was appointed a Colonel of Royal Marines on 31 July 1810, and was number 61 amongst those appointed Knight Commander of the Order of the Bath (KCB) in the restructuring of the Order on 2 January 1815, and promoted to Knight Grand Cross of the Order of the Bath (GCB) on 6 June 1831.

Inheritance and change of name in later life
In 1828, Sir Benjamin Hallowell succeeded to the estates of the Carew family of Beddington, Surrey, on the death of his cousin, who had herself inherited them from her brother-in-law.  In accordance with the terms of her will, he assumed the Carew name and coat of arms, becoming known as Admiral Sir Benjamin Hallowell Carew. He died on 2 September 1834.

Hallowell-Carew married Ann Inglefield, daughter of John Nicholson Inglefield. They were the parents of Captain Charles Hallowell-Carew R.N., who married Mary Murray Maxwell, daughter of Sir Murray Maxwell and great granddaughter of Sir Alexander Maxwell, 2nd Bt., of Myrton Castle, Wigtownshire.

References

Further reading
Elson, Bryan, Nelson's Yankee Captain: The Life of Boston Loyalist Sir Benjamin Hallowell (2008)  ;  
Laughton, J. K., ‘Carew, Sir Benjamin Hallowell (1760–1834)’, rev. Roger Morriss, Oxford Dictionary of National Biography, Oxford University Press, 2004; online edition, May 2007,

External links
Portrait of Sir Benjamin Hallowell Carew by John Hayter at the National Portrait Gallery in London
Sir Benjamin Hallowell Carew's robes as a Knight Grand Cross of the Order of the Bath, displayed at the National Maritime Museum, London
Manuscript letter from Sir Benjamin Hallowell to Captain Lempriere of HMS Trent, 1815

|-

1761 births
1834 deaths
Hallowell family
Royal Navy personnel of the American Revolutionary War
Royal Navy personnel of the French Revolutionary Wars
Royal Navy admirals
Knights Grand Cross of the Order of the Bath
People from colonial Boston
People from the London Borough of Croydon
Royal Navy personnel of the Napoleonic Wars
Royal Marines officers
American Loyalists from Massachusetts